Dagur may refer to:

 Daur people, or dagur, an ethnic group in northeastern China
 Dagur language
 Dagur (name), an Icelandic male given name
 Dagur, a fictional character in TV series DreamWorks Dragons

See also

 Dagr, the personification of day in Norse mythology
 Dagger (disambiguation)
 Mongol Daguur, a steppe and wetland region in Mongolia